The 2016 Indonesian Masters Grand Prix Gold (officially known as the Yonex Sunrise Indonesian Masters 2016 for sponsorship reasons) was the 13th grand prix's badminton tournament of the 2016 BWF Grand Prix Gold and Grand Prix. The tournament was held at the Balikpapan Sport and Convention Center in Balikpapan, East Kalimantan, Indonesia on 6 to 11 September 2016 and had a total purse of $120,000.

Men's singles

Seeds

  Wei Nan (semifinal)
  Ihsan Maulana Mustofa (quarterfinal)
  Ajay Jayaram (quarterfinal)
  Jonatan Christie (second round)
  Tanongsak Saensomboonsuk (quarterfinal)
  Sony Dwi Kuncoro (second round)
  H.S. Prannoy (third round)
  Iskandar Zulkarnain Zainuddin (withdrew)
  Anthony Sinisuka Ginting (first round)
  B. Sai Praneeth (third round)
  Shi Yuqi (champion)
  Huang Yuxiang (final)
  Goh Soon Huat (third round)
  Soo Teck Zhi (first round)
  Xue Song (third round)
  Chong Wei Feng (second round)

Finals

Top half

Section 1

Section 2

Section 3

Section 4

Bottom half

Section 5

Section 6

Section 7

Section 8

Women's singles

Seeds

  Busanan Ongbumrungpan (champion)
  Nichaon Jindapon (semifinal)
  Lindaweni Fanetri (withdrew)
  Liang Xiaoyu (second round)
  Chen Yufei (second round)
  Ayumi Mine (quarterfinal)
  Pornpawee Chochuwong (semifinal)
  Goh Jin Wei (final)

Finals

Top half

Section 1

Section 2

Bottom half

Section 3

Section 4

Men's doubles

Seeds

  Mohammad Ahsan / Hendra Setiawan (withdrew)
  Angga Pratama / Ricky Karanda Suwardi (semifinal)
  Berry Angriawan / Rian Agung Saputro (quarterfinal)
  Hardianto / Kenas Adi Haryanto (quarterfinal)
  Wahyu Nayaka / Kevin Sanjaya Sukamuljo (champion)
  Huang Kaixiang / Wang Yilu (quarterfinal)
  Hendra Aprida Gunawan / Markis Kido (quarterfinal)
  Fajar Alfian / Muhammad Rian Ardianto (first round)

Finals

Top half

Section 1

Section 2

Bottom half

Section 3

Section 4

Women's doubles

Seeds

  Anggia Shitta Awanda / Ni Ketut Mahadewi Istirani (withdrew)
  Della Destiara Haris / Rosyita Eka Putri Sari (semifinal)
  Jongkolphan Kititharakul / Rawinda Prajongjai (final)
  Chae Yoo-jung / Kim So-yeong (champion)

Finals

Top half

Section 1

Section 2

Bottom half

Section 3

Section 4

Mixed doubles

Seeds

  Praveen Jordan / Debby Susanto (withdrew)
  Ronald Alexander / Melati Daeva Oktaviani (champion)
  Tan Kian Meng / Lai Pei Jing (final)
  Hafiz Faisal / Shella Devi Aulia (semifinal)
  Huang Kaixiang / Li Yinhui (quarterfinal)
  Terry Hee Yong Kai / Tan Wei Han (withdrew)
  Chung Eui-seok / Chae Yoo-jung (second round)
  Edi Subaktiar / Richi Puspita Dili (semifinal)

Finals

Top half

Section 1

Section 2

Bottom half

Section 3

Section 4

References

External links 
 Tournament Information at www.badmintonindonesia.org 

Indonesian Masters (badminton)
Indonesia
2016 in Indonesian sport
Indonesian Masters Grand Prix Gold